Mabus may refer to:

 An alleged predecessor to the third antichrist, or the antichrist itself, according to Nostradamus in popular culture
Quatrain 2:62, work by Nostradamus
Mabus Point, a cape on the Antarctic coast
Ray Mabus, former U.S. Secretary of the Navy, former Governor of Mississippi, former U.S. Ambassador
Brawlhalla player, two defense Ember enthusiast
 A musical work for large symphony orchestra by French contemporary composer Jean-Louis Agobet

See also
 Mabu (disambiguation)